Hilal Nador or "Hilal Athletic de Nador"  (en ), is a Moroccan sports club from Nador. Founded in 1956. It is considered the first club in the city, and with Fath Nador it forms the two football poles in the city.

References

Football clubs in Morocco
1956 establishments in Morocco
Sports clubs in Morocco